Edla (10th-century - 11th century), was a Slavic Viking Age woman.  She was the mother of King Emund of Sweden and Queen Astrid of Norway. 

Tradition says Edla was the daughter of a Lechitic Tribal chief who has ruled part of terrain between Oder and Elbe . She was brought to Sweden as a prisoner of war c. 1000 at the same time or a little before, the arrival of Estrid of the Obotrites (Estrid av obotriterna).   

King Olof Skötkonung married Estrid but also had Edla as his mistress. She became the mother of Emund, Astrid, and probably Holmfrid. Snorre Sturlasson says that her children were sent to foster parents away from the royal court because Queen Estrid was not kind to them. This could indicate that Edla died when her children were small.

Children
 Emund the Old, King of Sweden
 Astrid Olofsdotter,  married King Olav II of Norway
 Holmfrid, wife of Sven Ladejarl

References 
 Ohlmarks, Åke Alla Sveriges drottningar
 Lagerqvist, Lars O.  Sverige och dess regenter under 1.000 år (Albert Bonniers Förlag AB, 1982) .

Mistresses of Swedish royalty
11th-century Swedish women
House of Munsö
10th-century Swedish people
11th-century Swedish people
10th-century Swedish women